Airaa is a 2019 Indian Tamil-language horror film written and directed by KM Sarjun. The film stars Nayanthara and Kalaiyarasan. The film is produced by Kotapadi J Rajesh under the production banner KJR Studios. The film was initially expected to be released on the eve of Christmas but the shooting of the film wasn't completed as planned until December 2018. Nayanthara is playing a dual role in a film for the second time after Maya (2015).

Plot
The film begins with Yamuna (Nayanthara), a journalist, who is so agitated at her work. She runs away from home to escape a marriage alliance to meet her grandmother Parvathy (Kulappulli Leela) and stay with her. She goes to stay with Parvathy in the rural area of Tamil Nadu. Meanwhile, Amudhan (Kalaiyarasan) is investigating a string of deaths that have been happening in the area. Meanwhile, Yamuna, Parvathy, Mani (Yogi Babu), and Mani's little nephew Babloo (Ashwanth Ashokkumar) start making fake ghost videos on YouTube, which go viral.

Yamuna is being haunted by a ghost but is unsure who it is. One night, she and her grandmother are attacked by the ghost. Yamuna wakes up in a hospital and learns that her grandmother is alive but in critical condition. She later sees a butterfly in the middle of the night, which leads her out of her room. On the floor, she finds drawings of the butterfly, which leads her to her grandmother's hospital room. She finds her grandmother dead. Amudhan, who is talking to the ghost, Bhavani (Nayanthara), tells her that revenge is not important and that she should not kill people. Bhavani says her job is almost done: she just needs to kill Yamuna.

At Parvathy's funeral, Yamuna's parents criticise Mani about his idea of making the fake ghost videos. Yamuna is greeted by Babloo, who says that Bhavani is a good person and that everyone killed her. Babloo's face then turns into ash, revealing that he was never there and he is not Mani's nephew; he was a ghost as well. Yamuna does research on Babloo and Bhavani while Amudhan tries to locate Yamuna to save her. Yamuna's research leads her to Amudhan's house and the two meet. Yamuna also locks the haunted house and goes back to her parents to escape the ghost, but the ghost haunts her there as well. One night, the same butterfly leads Yamuna out of her bedroom and she screams in horror when she sees Bhavani and Babloo's ghosts together. She then hears her parents crying for help, only to find them sleeping. Yamuna sees a drawing of the butterfly on the window and breaks down.

Yamuna decides to interact with the ghost after being so fed up with her haunted visions. She even goes back to the haunted house, now in a dilapidated state and cleans up the house. She and Amudhan meet 2 priests who say that they will do prayers to the god, Bhairava and Amudhan must go to the cemetery, dig up Bhavani's dead body and destroy it with a trident so that Bhavani cannot use her dead body again. Amudhan succeeds and Bhavani appears but in under control by the religious chants.

As Yamuna asks why Bhavani is trying to kill her. Bhavani tells her about her past.

Bhavani's father cries upon realizing his second wife has given birth to another baby girl, when he expected a baby boy from his first marriage itself. As he walks out to inform their relatives, he dies by lightning. This incident causes the villagers to believe that it is because of Bhavani and that she is cursed. Bhavani's own mother and sister hate her. During Bhavani's 16th birthday, her elder sister gives birth to a stillborn baby. Again, people believe it is because of Bhavani's "cursed" nature. Thus, Bhavani faces abuse and humiliation. She meets Amudhan at school and he falls in love with her. After Amudhan's father finds out, he sends him to college in New Delhi. Bhavani is left heartbroken. Bhavani was rejected by boys willing to marry her because of her dark complexion. One night, her brother-in-law tries to sexually assault her. Bhavani's family kicks her out, believing her brother-in-law over her innocence. Bhavani moves to Chennai and does odd jobs at a hotel. She ends up meeting Amudhan again at a restaurant. He proposes to her, and she accepts. Bhavani moves into Amudhan's house. On the day of the marriage, Bhavani finishes her shift and gets ready. Before she leaves, Mohit Agarwal, the owner of a beer company asks her to clean his room and to stay back for the night with him but she disagrees and walks away silently. She tries to take the elevator in which Yamuna is present but Yamuna does not hold the door to let Bhavani in. This delays her arrival at the marriage sub-registrar office in Saidapet, where Amudhan is waiting. She gets into an auto-rickshaw. Along the way, she encounters 2 people who abuse her and steal her ring which was a gift given by Amudhan. The 2 men decide to sell the ring for buying liquor. A police officer arrests Bhavani for no fault of hers. When the police find the real culprit, she is released. She manages to overcome all of them. She also meets Babloo, who asks her to help him cross the street. As they do so, a drunk lorry driver hits them and causes their deaths.

Bhavani reveals that she killed her mother, sister, brother-in-law, Mohit, the police officer, the lorry driver (who killed her and Babloo), the two men who stole her ring and Yamuna's grandmother Parvathy. Yamuna now reimagines how Bhavani's life could have turned out if only she had let her enter the elevator that day. Feeling remorseful, she asks Bhavani's spirit what she wants. Bhavani says that she wants Yamuna's body to live with Amudhan. Yamuna accepts it to pay for her mistake, which contributed to Bhavani's death. On the day of the marriage between Bhavani and Amudhan, Bhavani possesses Yamuna and sits down for her wedding. However, Amudhan refuses to live with Bhavani using Yamuna's body. Hence, he kills himself and tells her, that they now can live together in the afterlife. Bhavani then leaves Yamuna's body. 
A prophetic vision shows Bhavani and Amudhan getting married at the sub-registrar office. 
The film ends at the cemetery, with Yamuna at Bhavani and Amudhan's graves, while the same red butterfly from Yamuna's haunted visions, flies by.

Cast

 Nayanthara as Bhavani and Yamuna (Dual role) 
 Gabriella Sellus as young Bhavani
 Kalaiyarasan as Amudhan
 Yogi Babu as Mani
 Jayaprakash as Yamuna's father
 Meera Krishnan as Yamuna's mother
 Kulappulli Leela as Parvathy Paati, Yamuna's grandmother
 Gokulnath as Francis
 Nishaanth Ramakrishnan as Adhi
 Ashwanth Ashokkumar as Babloo, Mani's ghost nephew
 Senthi Kumari as Bhavani's mother
 Nitish Veera as Bhavani's brother-in-law
 Maathevan as young Amudhan
 Vinod Sagar as Kullan
 Mona Bedre as Doctor
 Winner Ramachandran as Auto Rickshaw Driver
 Arun & Aravind as Priests
 Saanvitha
 Jeeva Subramanian 
 Balla as Guruji
 R. S. G. Chelladurai

Production
The film was announced by young filmmaker KM Sarjun who rose to prominence in Kollywood for his maiden directorial venture titled Echcharikkai which was released in late August 2018. The film marks yet another women-centric prominent role for Nayanthara. The KJR Studios decided to produce this film which also previously produced Nayanthara's political starrer Aramm. The film also marks Nayanthara's 63rd film and also this will be the first instance for her where she will play dual roles in a film. Sundaramurthy KS, Sudarshan Srinivasan and Karthik Joges were assigned as the music director, cinematographer and film editor respectively, continuing their association with the director from his previous film. The shooting of the film wrapped up in December 2018.

Soundtrack
This film's music is composed by Sundarmurthy KS, and lyrics were written by Yugabharathi, Pa. Vijay, and Thamarai.

Release
The film, which had its theatrical release on 28 March 2019, received negative responses for the illogical screenplay of the film.

References

External links 
 

Indian horror films
2010s Tamil-language films
2019 horror films
2019 films